Patricia Renee' Thomas (born 1995) is an American painter, draftswoman, and art educator based in Philadelphia.

Early life and education
Patricia Renee' Thomas graduated from the Tyler School of Art. She received her Masters in Fine Arts from The University of Pennsylvania's Weitzman School of Design with a Certificate in Education.

Artistic practice
Thomas's earlier work examines themes of beauty in Western figure painting while referencing the visual history of blackness. As the work expanded,  Patricia looks to remedy lived and inherited experiences, calling back to her Black girlhood to rewrite memory and create the opportunity for reflection and rest. Thomas' work references advertising's longstanding use of blackness and that relationship to the historical exploitation of African-Americans.

Thomas is currently a Painting and Drawing instructor at Temple University's Tyler School of Art and Architecture Continuing Education. . She is also currently a fine arts teacher at Church of the Advocate in North Philadelphia.

References

External links
Patricia Renne' Thomas' paintings critique black exploitation - Bryony Stone
PATRICIA RENEE THOMAS - HONEYSUCKLES - New Image Art Gallery

Living people
1995 births
African-American painters
21st-century African-American people